Pancracio Celdrán Gomáriz (1942 – 24 March 2019) was a Spanish professor, intellectual and journalist whose specialties were the history and literature of antiquity and the medieval period.

Life
Born in Murcia, Celdrán received a degree in Hispanic literature and a doctorate in philosophy and letters from the Universidad Complutense de Madrid; a master's degree in comparative history; and has also received degrees in middle eastern history, English literature, comparative literature, and Hebrew language and culture. 

Celdrán's academic activities took him to various universities in the United States (notably Berkeley), in Europe, and in Israel (namely at the University of Haifa, the Hebrew University of Jerusalem, and Ben-Gurion University of the Negev). He was also a guest professor at the International Lebanese University in Beirut. 

Though Celdrán worked occasionally in print and on television, his journalistic activities were chiefly in the medium of radio, where he has worked as a writer, executive producer, and special correspondent. He has also participated in radio tertulias (in effect, panel discussions). He was a contributor to No es un día cualquiera ("It's Not Just Another Day"), a weekend news magazine broadcast by Radio Nacional de España, and the resident linguistic consultant of El Semanal, the Sunday supplement published by the Grupo Vocento.  However the prestige that this tribunes could provide him, Celdrán was critically reviewed as denigratory to non-standard speakers and other political, religious and sexual positions different from his.

In addition to many books, Celdrán contributed material to Raíces ("Roots"), a cultural review of the Jewish community in Spain.

Celdrán died on 24 March 2019 in Madrid, at the age of 77.

Relevance 
His Diccionario de topónimos españoles y sus gentilicios [Dictionary of Spanish Toponyms and Demonyms] (2002) has been chosen by the Spanish Wikipedia as a final source of authority on Spanish toponyms, both for terms still in use and for traditional names which have already fallen out of use.

Bibliography
 Inventario general de insultos, "General Inventory of Insults", 1995. .
 Libro de los elogios, "Book of Praises", 1996. .
 Plazas y plazuelas de Madrid, "Malls and Squares of Madrid", 1998, 
 Madrid se escribe con "M" de mujer: callejero femenino de Madrid, "Madrid is Spelled with the 'M' of Mujer: a Feminine Street Guide to Madrid", 1999. 
 Creencias populares: (costumbres, manías y rarezas: con su explicación, historia y origen), "Popular Beliefs (Customs, Crazes, and Oddities: with their Explanations, Histories, and Origins), 2000. 
 Anecdotario histórico: (tres mil años de anécdotas), "Historical Anecdotary: (Three Thousand Years of Anecdotes)", 2000. .
 El amor y la vida material en la Grecia clásica, "Love and Material Life in Classical Greece", 2001. .
 Diccionario de topónimos españoles y sus gentilicios, "Dictionary of Spanish Toponyms and Demonyms", 2002. .
 Red de Juderías de España: caminos de Sefarad, "The Web of Spanish Jewry: Paths of Sepharad", 2005. .
 Hablar con corrección: normas, dudas y curiosidades de la lengua española, "Properly Speaking: Norms, Common Errors, and Curiosities of the Spanish Tongue", 2006. .
 El gran libro de los insultos, "The Big Book of Insults", 2008, .
 Hablar bien no cuesta tanto, "It Doesn't Cost All That Much To Speak Well", 2009, .
 El gran libro de la historia de las cosas, "The Big Book of the History of Things", 2009, 
 Refranes de nuestra vida, "Sayings of Our Life", 2009,

References

External links 

  Biography of Pancracio Celdrán in Temas de Hoy.
  Biography in La Esfera de los Libros.
  Biography in Viceversa.
  Works published by Pancracio Celdrán
  Pancracio Celdrán on RNE, including recordings of his work on the RNE program "No es un día cualquiera"

1942 births
2019 deaths
Murcian writers
People from Murcia
Spanish male writers
Spanish Jews
Jewish writers